A divergent question is a question with no specific answer, but rather exercises one's ability to think broadly about a certain topic.

In education
Popular in inquiry education, divergent questions allow students to explore different avenues and create many different variations and alternative answers or scenarios. Correctness may be based on logical projections, may be contextual, or arrived at through basic knowledge, conjecture, inference, projection, creation, intuition, or imagination. These types of questions often require students to analyze, synthesize, or evaluate a knowledge base and then project or predict different outcomes.

A simple example of a divergent question is:
Write down as many different uses as you can think of for the following objects: (1) a brick, (2) a blanket.

References
Gladwell, M (2008) Outliers. Hachette Book Group, New York City, NY.
Erickson, H. L. (2007) Concept-based curriculum and instruction for the  thinking classroom. Thousand Oaks, Corwin Press.

Analysis
Imagination
Educational psychology